Derek Gary Kamukwamba  is an Anglican bishop in Zambia.

References

Anglican bishops of Central Zambia
21st-century Anglican bishops in Africa
Living people
Year of birth missing (living people)